The 1950–51 season was the 12th season in UE Lleida's existence, first in La Liga, and covered the period from 1 July 1950 to 30 June 1951. Having won promotion in the previous season UE Lleida struggled in the league and finished bottom and subsequently got relegated back to the Segunda División. They did fair a little better in the Copa Federación by reaching the semi-finals to crash out 6–3 aggregate against Barakaldo CF.

First-team squad

League table

External links
1950-51 season

1951
Lleida